Gephyrochromis is a small genus of haplochromine cichlids endemic to Lake Malawi in east Africa.

Species
There are currently two recognized species in this genus:
 Gephyrochromis lawsi Fryer, 1957
 Gephyrochromis moorii Boulenger, 1901

References

 
Haplochromini

Taxa named by George Albert Boulenger
Cichlid genera